Naukšēni is a village in Naukšēni Parish, Valmiera Municipality in the Vidzeme region of Latvia. It is the centre of Naukšēni Parish.

Towns and villages in Latvia
Valmiera Municipality
Kreis Wolmar
Vidzeme